There are two amphoe (districts) named Nong Saeng in Thailand, which, however, have two different Thai spellings
Amphoe Nong Saeng, Saraburi province (หนองแซง)
Amphoe Nong Saeng, Udon Thani province (หนองแสง)

Nong Saeng